BookPeople is an independent bookstore in Austin, Texas, and the largest bookstore in the state of Texas.  It was founded in 1970 and has been voted the best bookstore by the Austin Chronicle every year since 1995 .

BookPeople was voted Publishers Weekly's "Best Bookstore in the US 2005". It is a member of the Austin Independent Business Alliance. It is also a member of the American Booksellers Association.

History 

BookPeople was founded in 1970 by Michael Nills and originally named Grok Books in reference to Stranger in a Strange Land by Robert A. Heinlein. The book store eventually fell into the hands of Philip Sansone, who renamed the store BookPeople in reference to Fahrenheit 451 by Ray Bradbury in 1984 when the store moved locations.
In 2018, the store formed a union, BookPeople United, under the auspices of the Office and Professional Employees International Union (OPEIU) Local 277. Their first contract was ratified in January 2021.

See also
 List of companies based in Austin, Texas

References

 Austin Chronicle

External links
 BookPeople website homepage
 Austin Independent Business Alliance

Independent bookstores of the United States
Companies based in Austin, Texas
Bookstores established in the 20th century
American companies established in 1970
Retail companies established in 1970
1970 establishments in Texas